"Pac-Man" (stylised as "PAC-MAN") is a song by British virtual band Gorillaz featuring American rapper Schoolboy Q. The track was released on 20 July 2020 as the sixth single for Gorillaz' seventh studio album, Song Machine, Season One: Strange Timez, and the fifth episode of the Song Machine project, a web series involving the ongoing release of various Gorillaz tracks featuring different guest musicians over the course of 2020.

Background
The song was recorded in London, prior to the COVID-19 pandemic. It was released to commemorate the 40th anniversary of the arcade game, Pac-Man.

Music video
The video, directed by Jamie Hewlett, Tim McCourt, and Max Taylor, features the band members inside Kong Studios, the band's fictional headquarters. 2-D is in the game room playing the Pac-Man arcade game, Russel does some boxing with a punching bag, Murdoc is in the basement, sitting inside an orgone accumulator, and Noodle is on the recording studio couch with her mobile phone while Schoolboy Q records his verse. As 2-D continues to play the arcade game for nine hours, all of his bandmates feel the effects of the arcade game, such as Murdoc looking outside his accumulator, Russel pausing from punching as though he heard something, and Noodle changing art styles, switching to an anime-esque style and then a Peanuts-like character. At the end of the video, Noodle goes down to the game room and unplugs the Pac-Man arcade game, leaving 2-D confused.

The video incorporates many references to the arcade game, including:
 The arcade cabinet artwork is sightly redrawn with 2-D as the ghost and Murdoc as Pac-Man.
 Murdoc is wearing Pac-Man underwear.
 The arcade game portrays the band members as 8-bit characters, with 2-D as Pac-Man and Inky, Blinky, Pinky and Clyde replaced with the faces of Murdoc, Russel, and Noodle.

Track listing

Personnel
Gorillaz
 Damon Albarn – vocals, backing vocals, instrumentation, director, keyboards, bass, guitar, synthesizer, drums, percussion
 Jamie Hewlett – artwork, character design, video direction
 Remi Kabaka Jr. – percussion, drums

Additional musicians and personnel
 Schoolboy Q – vocals
 Prince Paul – backing vocals, engineering
 John Smythe – guitar
 Weathrman – bass, keyboards, synthesizer
 Stephen Sedgwick – mixing engineer, engineering
 Samuel Egglenton – engineering
 John Davis – mastering engineer
 Elvin "Wit" Shahbazian – engineering

Charts

References

2020 songs
2020 singles
Gorillaz songs
Songs written by Damon Albarn
Songs written by Remi Kabaka Jr.
Parlophone singles
Warner Records singles
Pac-Man
British funk songs
G-funk songs
Downtempo songs
Electropop songs
Schoolboy Q songs
Songs written by Prince Paul (producer)
Songs written by Schoolboy Q
Song Machine
Music based on video games
Songs about fictional characters